Escadron de Transport 50 Réunion is a French Air and Space Force squadron located at Roland Garros Airport, Réunion, France which operates the CASA/IPTN CN-235.

References

Bibliography

See also
 List of French Air and Space Force aircraft squadrons

French Air and Space Force squadrons